Papyrus Oxyrhynchus 211 (P. Oxy. 211 or P. Oxy. II 211) is a fragment of the Perikeiromene (976–1008) of Menander, written in Greek. It was discovered in Oxyrhynchus. The manuscript was written on papyrus in the form of a roll. It is dated to the first or second century. Currently it is housed in the Houghton Library (3734) of Harvard University.

Description 
The document was written by an unknown copyist. The measurements of the fragment are 334 by 132 mm. It contains a fragment of a lost comedy: the conclusion of Menander's Perikeiromene (The Girl with her Hair Cut Short). The text is written in a round uncial hand. There is a tendency to separate words.

The manuscript was revised by a second hand, probably a contemporary, whose handwriting is generally cursive. The second hand is responsible for the punctuation.

There are a few misspellings (e.g. ΕΥΑΓΕΛΙΑ in line 18) and the wrong insertion of two iotas adscript in line 45. The occurrence of the Attic forms in a manuscript of the Roman period are remarkable.

It was discovered by Grenfell and Hunt in 1897 in Oxyrhynchus, together with a large number of documents dated in the reigns of Vespasian, Domitian, and Trajan. The text was published by Grenfell and Hunt in 1899. The manuscript was re-examined by Gerald M. Browne in 1974.

See also 
 Oxyrhynchus Papyri
 Perikeiromene
 Papyrus Oxyrhynchus 210
 Papyrus Oxyrhynchus 212

References

Further reading 
 Gerald M. Browne, The End of Menander's Perikeiromene, Bulletin of the Institute of Classical Studies, Volume 21, Issue 1, pages 43–54, December 1974.

211
1st-century manuscripts
2nd-century manuscripts